Jonathan Douglass Reid (born October 24, 1972) is an American professional boxer who challenged for the WBA middleweight title in 2000.

He was a contestant on reality TV show The Contender. On the show, he was placed on the East Coast team, fighting Jesse Brinkley in the second first round fight. In a second consecutive surprise (after Gomez beat Manfredo), Reid lost a hard fought fight against Brinkley. As of January 2009 Reid's professional record stood at 34-11 with 19 wins by knockout.

He is a single parent and has five children.

External links

Notes

Boxers from Tennessee
1972 births
Living people
Sportspeople from Nashville, Tennessee
The Contender (TV series) participants
American male boxers
Middleweight boxers